Omorgus marshalli is a species of hide beetle in the subfamily Omorginae.

References

marshalli
Beetles described in 1957